Pristen may refer to:
Pristen (inhabited locality), name of several inhabited localities in Russia
Pristen (moth), a genus of moth